The Galway Technical Institute is a college of further education providing QQI Level 5 & 6 programmes. The college is located in on Father Griffin Road, Claddagh, Galway, Ireland.

The college provides programmes which are recognised and accredited by the QQI. Galway Technical Institute has programmes available across 10 departments that include Applied Health Sciences, Art & Design, Arts & Social Studies, Business & Law, Fashion, Hairdressing & Beauty, IT & Computing, Media, Sport, & Technology: Design & Engineering.

The college also provides non-accredited and accredited adult education part-time programmes.

History

In January 1893 the board of guardians of Galway Poor Law Union decided to establish a technical school in Galway city. Eventually a site was purchased on Dominick Street and in January 1894 classes began. These classes catered for 35 all male student and initially the courses being provided were mathematics, theoretics and physiography, machine construction, building and woodwork. It soon became clear, however, that the building was not large enough to cater for the number of interested student. This led to the purchasing of a site on Father Griffin road (the current location) and construction work on a new building was completed in 1938 with the official opening taking place in September of that year. Initially the school catered for second level students only, but towards the end of the 20th century it became a third level educational facility.

Some sources identify the site of the college as being originally occupied by a marine school associated with the nearby docks.

References

External links
 Official website

Further education colleges in the Republic of Ireland
Education in County Galway